Auburndale may refer to:

 Auburndale, Alberta
 Auburndale, Nova Scotia
 Auburndale, Florida
 Auburndale, Louisville, Kentucky, a neighborhood
 Auburndale, Massachusetts
Auburndale station (MBTA)
 Auburndale, Wisconsin
 Auburndale (town), Wisconsin
 Auburndale, Queens, a New York City neighborhood
Auburndale station (LIRR)

See also
 Auburndale, a canceled product in the list of Intel microprocessors